Sebastian Zbik (born 17 March 1982) is a German professional boxer and the former WBC middleweight Champion of the world. He resides in Mecklenburg-Vorpommern.

Professional career 
Zbik won the interim WBC middleweight title against Italian Domenico Spada on 11 July 2009. He was given the full title in January 2011 when the WBC promoted Sergio Martínez to Emeritus champion.

Zbik lost his newly awarded WBC Middleweight Championship against undefeated Mexican Julio César Chávez Jr. at Staples Center Los Angeles, California on 4 June 2011.

On 13 April 2012, Zbik went to Cologne, Germany, to face fellow German and current WBA Super World Middleweight Champion Felix Sturm in a German world title showdown. Sturm would go on to earn his 16th KO in his 37 wins with a 9th round TKO stoppage of Zbik.

See also 
 List of WBC world champions
 List of middleweight boxing champions

References

External links 
 
 Boxing-Encyclopedia

1982 births
Living people
People from Neubrandenburg
World boxing champions
World middleweight boxing champions
World Boxing Council champions
Middleweight boxers
German male boxers
Sportspeople from Mecklenburg-Western Pomerania